Nathan Gaucher (born November 6, 2003) is a Canadian junior ice hockey centre for the Quebec Remparts of the Quebec Major Junior Hockey League (QMJHL) as a prospect to the Anaheim Ducks of the National Hockey League (NHL). He was drafted 22nd overall by the Ducks in the 2022 NHL Entry Draft.

Playing career
Gaucher played with Saint-Hyacinthe Gaulois in the Quebec Junior AAA Hockey League (QMAAA) before he was selected 8th overall in the 2019 QMJHL Entry Draft by the Quebec Remparts.

In his draft eligible season with the Remparts in 2021–22, Gaucher, was awarded the Michael Bossy Trophy as the QMJHL's Best Professional Prospect after scoring 31 goals and 26 assists for 57 points in 66 games.

Ranked a mid-first round draft selection leading into the 2022 NHL Entry Draft by NHL Central Scouting Bureau, Gaucher was selected 22nd overall by the Anaheim Ducks on July 7, 2022. Later that month, Gaucher was signed to his first NHL contract by the Ducks agreeing to a three-year, entry-level contract on July 29, 2022.

International play

Gaucher was named to Team Canada for the COVID-delayed 2022 World Junior Ice Hockey Championships, winning gold.

On December 12, 2022, Gaucher was named to Team Canada to compete at the 2023 World Junior Ice Hockey Championships. During the tournament he recorded one goal and three assists in seven games and won a gold medal.

Career statistics

Regular season and playoffs

International

Awards and honours

References

External links

2003 births
Living people
Anaheim Ducks draft picks
Canadian ice hockey centres
Ice hockey people from Quebec
National Hockey League first-round draft picks
People from Longueuil
Quebec Remparts players